Yangjeong Station is a station on the Gyeongui-Jungang Line in Namyangju, Gyeonggi Province, South Korea. In 2021, 685 people boarded at this station and 598 disembarked.

References

External links
 Station information from Korail

Metro stations in Namyangju
Seoul Metropolitan Subway stations
Railway stations opened in 2005